Dynasties is a 2018 British nature documentary series on five vulnerable or endangered species known to form enduring populations: chimpanzee, emperor penguin, lion, tiger and African wild dog. The series is produced by the BBC Natural History Unit and narrated by David Attenborough. The music score was composed by Benji Merrison. Each episode ends with Dynasties On Location, a behind the scenes look at the planning of each episode, which could be years in advance before production crew even started filming.

The series debut was on 11 November 2018 simultaneously broadcast on BBC One, BBC One HD and BBC Earth, and premiered on the same day in Asia. The series debuts in the U.S. as a four-network simulcast (BBC America, AMC, IFC, and Sundance) on 19 January 2019, and in New Zealand on TVNZ 1 on 20 January 2019 (NZDT), with all 5 episodes available on TVNZ On Demand.

On December 28, 2020, on the same day that a Christmas special following a meerkat family was broadcast, it was announced that the BBC would be creating a sequel to Dynasties named Dynasties II. This series will have four episodes, following Angelina the African elephant matriarch, she-cheetah Kali, Rupestre the puma and spotted hyena matriarch Suma, and will air in 2022.

Episodes 

Viewing data sourced from BARB.

Dynasties

Dynasties II

Merchandise

Home media
The series was released as a two-disc DVD set as well as a standard Blu-ray set on 3 December 2018, and as a four-disc 4K UHD Blu-ray + Blu-ray set on 10 December 2018. Media is distributed by BBC Studios in the UK.

Book 
An accompanying hardback book was written by Steven Moss with a foreword by David Attenborough. It is published by BBC Books and released on 25 October 2018 in the UK.

The book Painted Wolves: A Wild Dog's Life by Nicholas Dyer and Peter Blinston is a large-format coffee-table book that charts the lives and fortunes of the same packs of painted wolves featured in BBC Dynasties. It is published by Lycaon Ventures.

Soundtrack

The musical score and songs featured in the series were composed by Benji Merrison and Will Slater. A digital soundtrack was released on 11 November 2018, while a two physical disc will be released on 14 December 2018 in the UK.

References

External links
 
 Dynasties at BBC Earth
 Dynasties at BBC Media Centre
 

2018 British television series debuts
2020 British television series endings
2010s British documentary television series
2020s British documentary television series
David Attenborough
BBC Television shows
Documentary films about nature
BBC high definition shows
BBC television documentaries
English-language television shows
Television series by BBC Studios